Morris Benton Thacker (May 21, 1934 – November 13, 1997) was an American professional baseball player. A catcher, Thacker's pro career extended for 13 seasons and included the entire  campaign and parts of four others in Major League Baseball for the Chicago Cubs (1958; 1960–62) and St. Louis Cardinals (1963).

Baseball career
Thacker was born in Louisville, Kentucky, and signed with the New York Yankees in 1952 after his graduation from duPont Manual High School. After six years in the Yankee farm system, he was acquired by the Cubs and was recalled in August  from the Double-A Texas League. In the third at bat of his debut game August 3 at Connie Mack Stadium, he hit a home run off Seth Morehead of the Philadelphia Phillies to help the Cubs out-slug the Phils, 12–10. Two days later, in his third MLB game, he hit another solo shot, this time against Stu Miller of the San Francisco Giants, helping the Cubs hang on to win another slugfest, 10–9 at Wrigley Field. They would be his only Major League home runs in 158 games played and 260 at bats.

During the latter year, he played in 54 games with Chicago and split catching duties with left-handed-hitting Sammy Taylor. Only in 1962 did he spend the entire year on the Cubs' National League roster, appearing in a career-high 65 games, 35 as a starting catcher. But he batted only .187.

At the end of the season, October 17, he was included in a trade with the Cardinals, packaged with outfielder George Altman and pitcher Don Cardwell in a deal for pitchers Larry Jackson and Lindy McDaniel and catcher Jimmie Schaffer.

Facing Baseball Hall of Famer Sandy Koufax—and catching another Hall-bound pitcher, Bob Gibson—Thacker struck out in his only two plate appearances. Koufax shut out the Cardinals on three hits, 5–0. Thacker returned to minors for the balance of his career, retiring in 1964.

In his 158 big-league games, Thacker had 46 total hits, with seven doubles, his two rookie-season home runs and 20 runs batted in, batting .177.  He died in his home city of Louisville at the age of 63.

References

External links

1934 births
1997 deaths
Atlanta Crackers players
Baseball players from Louisville, Kentucky
Birmingham Barons players
Chicago Cubs players
Denver Bears players
Fort Worth Cats players
Houston Buffs players
Jacksonville Suns players
Joplin Miners players
Major League Baseball catchers
New Orleans Pelicans (baseball) players
Norfolk Tars players
Richmond Virginians (minor league) players
St. Louis Cardinals players